David Richard Genserowski (4 July 1875 – 31 December 1955) was a German gymnast. He competed in the men's individual all-around event at the 1900 Summer Olympics.

References

Further reading

1875 births
1955 deaths
German male artistic gymnasts
Olympic gymnasts of Germany
Gymnasts at the 1900 Summer Olympics
Gymnasts from Berlin
German emigrants to the United States